São Filipe is a concelho (municipality) of Cape Verde. Situated in the western part of the island of Fogo, it covers 49% of the island area (228.84 km2), and is home to 60% of its population (22,248 at the 2010 census). Its seat is the city São Filipe. Agriculture is the main employment of the municipality, followed by tourism.

Subdivisions
The municipality consists of two freguesias (civil parishes):
São Lourenço
Nossa Senhora da Conceição

History
It was created in 1991, when the older Municipality of Fogo was split in two, the southwestern part becoming the Municipality of São Filipe and the northeastern part becoming the Municipality of Mosteiros. In 2005, an eastern parish of the municipality was split off to become the Municipality of Santa Catarina do Fogo.

Demography

Presidents
Eugênio Miranda da Veiga - MpD (until 2008)
Luís Pires - PAICV (as of early 2016)

Politics
Since 2016, the Movement for Democracy (MpD) is the ruling party of the municipality. The results of the latest elections, in 2016:

Sports
The city has the stadium, it has the Estadio 5 de Julho which is used for football (soccer), a multisport complex named Simão Mendes and a pavilion named Luzia Nunes located in another settlement close to Patim.  Sports clubs in the municipality include Académica do Fogo, Botafogo, Spartak d'Aguadinha, União, Valência and Vulcânicos.

Each year, the São Filipe Municipal Cup, a football (soccer) competition takes place each year in the months of September or October.  It features clubs from the municipality.  The 2016 edition featured two clubs from outside the municipality.

Twin towns

São Filipe is twinned with 10 Portuguese towns:
  Cinfães
  Espinho
  Leiria
  Matosinhos
  Moimenta da Beira
  Montijo
  Ourém
  Palmela
  Sesimbra
  Viseu

References

External links
Official website of the municipality
Official website of the town 

Municipalities of Cape Verde
Geography of Fogo, Cape Verde
1991 establishments in Cape Verde